Ryan Dale Watts (born 18 May 1988) is an English retired semi-professional footballer who played as a left back or left winger. He began his career in the Football League at Brentford and dropped into non-league football upon his release in 2006.

Career

Brentford
Watts began his career as a youth at Brentford. He was the leading appearance maker and leading scorer (along with Charlie Muldowney) for the U17 team during the 2003–04 season. Watts was part of the Brentford youth team which beat Arsenal in the third round of the 2004–05 FA Youth Cup, scoring in extra time to level the score at 2–2 and send the tie to penalties. Watts' first involvement with the first team came on 7 May 2005, when he was named as a substitute for the final League One game of the 2004–05 regular season at home to Hull City. The then-16-year-old Watts made his senior debut after 78 minutes of the 2–1 win, coming on for Matt Harrold. He failed to feature during Brentford's unsuccessful playoff campaign.

Watts made his first appearance of the 2005–06 season in a 5–0 League Cup defeat at Cheltenham Town on 23 August 2005, replacing Paul Brooker after 74 minutes. He made another appearance in a Football League Trophy first round shootout defeat to Oxford United on 18 October, replacing George Moleski (who in turn had replaced Eddie Hutchinson during the first half) during extra time. Watts was not called into the first team again and was released in June 2006. He made three appearances during his time with the Bees.

AFC Wimbledon
After an unsuccessful trial at Championship club Ipswich Town, Watts joined Isthmian League Premier Division club AFC Wimbledon during the 2006 off-season. His only appearance for the club came in a 2–1 Isthmian League Cup second round win over Hastings United on 12 September 2006. He departed the club in October 2006.

Sutton United 
Watts signed for Conference South club Sutton United in October 2006 and made his only appearance for the club in a 2–2 draw with Cambridge City on 14 November, replacing Richard Harris after 67 minutes. He departed in January 2007.

Carshalton Athletic 
Watts signed for Isthmian League Premier Division club Carshalton Athletic in January 2007 and made 12 league appearances in what remained of the 2006–07 season. Watts made regular appearances during the 2007–08 season and departed the club at the end of the campaign.

Harrow Borough 
Watts signed for Isthmian League Premier Division club Harrow Borough on 25 August 2008. He had a successful 2008–09 season and was voted the club's Player's Player Of The Season and Supporters' Player Of The Season. Watts made 35 appearances and scored four goals during the 2009–10 season. In the 2010–11 season, Watts appeared in Harrow's 2–0 FA Cup first round defeat to Chesterfield on 6 November 2010 and suffered heartbreak as Harrow lost to Tonbridge Angels in the playoff semi-finals. He made 43 appearances and scored four goals during the campaign. Watts departed the club in August 2011.

Barnet
Wells made a return to the Football League when he signed a one-month contract at League Two club Barnet on 2 August 2011. He failed to win a call into a squad and was released at the end of his contract.

St Albans City 
Watts signed for Southern League Premier Division club St Albans City in September 2011 and made 38 appearances and scored three goals during the 2011–12 season. He made 23 appearances during the 2012–13 season before leaving the club in December 2012.

Truro City (loan) 
Watts joined Conference South club Truro City on loan on 1 July 2012. He returned to St Albans on 8 August, before the beginning of the 2012–13 regular season.

Braintree Town 
Watts signed for Conference Premier club Braintree Town on 17 December 2012. Featuring mainly from the bench, he made 11 appearances during the remainder of the 2012–13 season as Braintree fought their way from the relegation places to a 9th-place finish.

Tonbridge Angels 
Watts dropped to the Conference South to join Tonbridge Angels on 13 May 2013. He departed the club at the end of the 2013–14 season, having made 29 appearances and scored one goal.

Metropolitan Police 
Watts dropped a division to sign for Isthmian League Premier Division club Metropolitan Police in July 2014. He made 9 appearances before departing Imber Court on 19 September.

Wealdstone
Watts signed for Wealdstone in mid-September 2014 and made the step back up to Conference South level. He made 39 appearances in 14 months at Grosvenor Vale and left the club due to injury problems and work commitments.

Personal life 
Watts has a son and works as a gym instructor and nutritionist.

Career statistics

Honours 
 Harrow Borough Players' Player of the Year: 2008–09
 Harrow Borough Supporters' Player of the Year: 2008–09

References

External links

1988 births
Living people
English footballers
Brentford F.C. players
Tonbridge Angels F.C. players
Braintree Town F.C. players
St Albans City F.C. players
Barnet F.C. players
Harrow Borough F.C. players
Carshalton Athletic F.C. players
AFC Wimbledon players
English Football League players
National League (English football) players
Sutton United F.C. players
Isthmian League players
Southern Football League players
Metropolitan Police F.C. players
Wealdstone F.C. players
Association football wingers